Art Troutner Houses Historic District is a roughly triangular historic district in Idaho Falls, Idaho containing three private houses designed by architect and entrepreneur Art Troutner.  This district was listed on the National Register of Historic Places on September 10, 2008.  It is the 11th property listed as a featured listing of the week in a program of the National Park Service that began in July 2008.

Aupperle Studio
The Aupperle Studio, also known as "Arrow House" is located at 3950 S. 5th W. on a  plot. It is single-story but tall house with an A-frame design. One unusual aspect of the house is its extensive use of "Cemento" or "Cemesto" material, including in  roof panels. This is a bonded mix of cementitious material and asbestos.

Migel House
The Migel House is located at 4032 S. 5th W.

Poitevin House
The Ada Poitevin House is located at 4012 S. 5th W.  It has, essentially, 16 sides.

References

Buildings and structures in Idaho Falls, Idaho
Houses on the National Register of Historic Places in Idaho
Houses in Bonneville County, Idaho
Historic districts on the National Register of Historic Places in Idaho
National Register of Historic Places in Bonneville County, Idaho